= Nairy Alamu =

Nairy Alamu is a civil servant in the Solomon Islands government service.

== Biography ==
Alamu studied at the University of the South Pacific.

She has held the position of Permanent Secretary for Communication, Aviation and Meteorology and Registrar of the Political Parties Commission. She has also held positions in not-for-profit organisations such as the Family Support Centre.
